Raffaele Guaita (June 26, 1922 – May 1, 1996) was an Italian professional football player. He was born in Vigevano.

References

1922 births
1996 deaths
Italian footballers
Serie A players
Inter Milan players
S.P.A.L. players
Association football defenders
Vigevano Calcio players